James DeNoon Reymert (October 24, 1821 – March 25, 1896) was an American newspaper editor, mine operator, lawyer and politician. He was a pioneer settler in Wisconsin Territory, early elected official in the state of Wisconsin and founded the first Norwegian language newspaper to be published in the United States.

Background
Reymert was born in Farsund, in the county of Vest-Agder, Norway. Several generations of his forefathers were in succession the pastors of the same church at the Søgne Parish from 1636 to 1738. His father, Christen Reymert, had been a ship owner and merchant in  Leith, Scotland and later a customs officer in Farsund. His mother, Jeanette Sinclair Denoon, had been born in Scotland. At age fifteen young Reymert left home to complete a course of study at a commercial college at Christiania. Later he went to Scotland, where he entered the commercial house of John Mitchell and Company at Leith, spending four years there. He studied law and literature at Edinburgh in the law offices of Murdoek and Spencer. He was under the guardianship of his uncle, the Reverend James Young, a Presbyterian minister.

Career
Reymert migrated to the United States during 1842 and in 1844 he married fellow Norwegian immigrant Anna Caspara Hensen. They settled down in the Muskego Settlement in Wisconsin. In 1847, James D. Reymert, Even Heg and Søren Bache agreed to start the Norwegian-language newspaper Nordlyset (The Northern Light). Reymert continued to serve as editor the paper until 1850, when it was sold and was moved to Racine, Wisconsin. In 1852, Reymert founded the village of Denoon on the shores of Lake DeNoon. The town was built around the first two-boiler sawmill in America. The town prospered, but was abandoned following a cholera epidemic. Reynert was also credited with getting a plank road built from Janesville to Milwaukee.

Public offices in Wisconsin 
Reymert was elected a member of the second Wisconsin constitutional convention (1847–1848). He served in 1849 as a Free Soil member of the Wisconsin State Assembly from Racine County, and as a member of the County's board of supervisors.

As a Democrat, he was elected to Wisconsin State Senate from the 10th District from 1854–1855, and, again served in the Assembly from Milwaukee County's 9th Assembly district in 1857. He also served as  district attorney, superintendent of schools, and served as vice-consul for Sweden and Norway. He was appointed receiver of the United States General Land Office and disbursing agent for the northwestern states as well as variety of other public positions. Reymert held public office in Wisconsin until 1860.

Through an acquaintance with Stephen A. Douglas, Reymert became a nominee for Wisconsin's 2nd congressional district in 1860 on the Democratic ticket, but lost to Luther Hanchett.

After Wisconsin 
In 1861, Reymert opened a law office in New York City and shortly afterward organized Hercules Mutual Life Assurance Society. Because of failing health in 1873, he relocated for a time to a farm on the Bio-Bio River near Mulchen, Chile. He returned to the United States, arriving in San Francisco in 1876. He had been contacted by former Wisconsin governor, Coles Bashford who had been appointed to  political office in the Arizona Territory. Reymert subsequently relocated to Pinal County. Here he organized the Reymert Silver Mines, built a mining and smelting operation and established the mining towns of DeNoon and Reymert, Arizona. Reymert published the weekly Pinal Drill, and at the same time he was also practiced law. James Denoon Reymert died in the spring of 1896 in Alhambra, California.

Legacy
Today, DeNoon and Reymert are ghost towns in Pinal County, Arizona. Lake Denoon is located at the boundary between Racine, and Waukesha Counties in Wisconsin. Denoon Park is  community park located in the southwestern portion of the city of Muskego, Wisconsin on the northwestern shore of Lake Denoon.

References

Further reading
Blegen, Theodore, Norwegian Migration to the United States (Norwegian- American Historical Association, Northfield, Minn., 1940)
Ronning, Nils Nilsen The Saga of Old Muskego (Old Muskego Memorial. Waterford, Wisconsin, 1943)

External links

Nordlyset, the first Norwegian language newspaper in America
Nordlyset Images
Reymert (slekt) Norwegian

1821 births
1896 deaths
American newspaper editors
Members of the Wisconsin State Assembly
Wisconsin state senators
Norwegian people of Scottish descent
People from Pinal County, Arizona
Politicians from Racine, Wisconsin
People from Muskego, Wisconsin
Norwegian emigrants to the United States
People from Farsund
Wisconsin Free Soilers
19th-century American politicians
Editors of Wisconsin newspapers
New York (state) lawyers
Wisconsin lawyers
19th-century American journalists
American male journalists
19th-century American male writers
19th-century American lawyers